Girls Club (sometimes styled in all-lowercase girls club) is an American television series created by David E. Kelley that was shown on Fox in the United States in October 2002. It is often compared to Ally McBeal, another series created by Kelley, which ended in May 2002.

Plot
Three young, female lawyers share a deep friendship and a common desire to leave their mark on the legal system. After graduating, they move to San Francisco where they find employment in the same law firm called Myers, Berry, Cherry & Fitch. There, the women attempt to break through the barriers of the male-dominated workforce. In describing the concept of girls club Kelley said, "I'm looking to capture both the nerves of a young associate and also the gender politics that go on inside big corporate law firms."

Cast
 Gretchen Mol as Lynne Camden
 Kathleen Robertson as Jeannie Falls 
 Chyler Leigh as Sarah Mickle
 Giancarlo Esposito as Nicholas Hahn
 Sam Jaeger as Kevin O'Neil
 Donovan Leitch as Michael Harrod

Production 
Fox added Girls Club to its Monday night schedule for Fall 2002 sight-unseen based on the success of creator David E. Kelley's previous series.  At the time of its cancellation six of the thirteen episodes ordered had been completed. Only two episodes were broadcast on Fox in the United States and on CH in Canada. FOX Latinoamerica aired the first two episodes on a Wednesday night premiere after heavy promotion, but during commercial breaks they played a clip saying the show was cancelled in the US and would not be back after that night. Episodes were never re-broadcast and the show disappeared from the network after that night.

Episodes 
The initial order was for 13 episodes. When the series was cancelled, six episodes were completed and only two had aired.

Reception
The series was consistently the lowest-rated show in the 18–49 demographic in its time slot, even being outrated by The WB's Everwood and UPN's Girlfriends. In a mid-season poll of favorite TV shows conducted by the magazine Electronic Media, Girls Club placed as the third worst show of the season.

References

External links 
 

2002 American television series debuts
2002 American television series endings
2000s American drama television series
2000s American legal television series
English-language television shows
Fox Broadcasting Company original programming
Television series by 20th Century Fox Television
Television shows set in San Francisco
Television series created by David E. Kelley